The Moroccan Royal Basketball Federation ((FRMBB) is the governing body of basketball in Morocco. that was Formed in 1956, based in the capital city Rabat. The FRMBB is a full member of the International Basketball Federation (FIBA) and also it is one of the FIBA Africa member. The current president of the federation is Aourach Mostafa.

Current Governors Bureau

Presidents 

 Mohamed Smirès
 Mohamed Alami
 Hamid Skalli
 Thami Bennis
 Mohammed Ibrahimi
 Hammouda Yousri
 Noureddine Benabdenbi
 khalid tajeddine
 Khalid Taje-eddine

See also
Morocco national basketball team
Morocco women's national basketball team
Morocco national under-19 basketball team
Morocco national under-17 basketball team
Morocco women's national under-19 basketball team
Morocco women's national under-17 basketball team
Morocco national 3x3 team
Morocco women's national 3x3 team
Morocco Division I Basketball League
Morocco Basketball Cup

References

External links
 Site web officiel de la FRMBB 

Basketball
Federation
Sports organizations established in 1956
1956 establishments in Morocco
National members of FIBA Africa